Emma Jane Inglis (born 15 July 1988) is an Australian cricketer.  She plays as a wicket-keeper and right-handed batter for Victorian Spirit and Melbourne Stars. In November 2018, she was named in the Melbourne Renegades' squad for the 2018–19 Women's Big Bash League season.

References

External links

1988 births
Australian women cricketers
Cricketers from Melbourne
Living people
Melbourne Stars (WBBL) cricketers
Sportswomen from Victoria (Australia)
Victoria women cricketers
Melbourne Renegades (WBBL) cricketers